Peter Anthony Caringi III (born September 24, 1992) is an American soccer player currently playing for Christos FC, a United States Adult Soccer Association team playing in the Baltimore metropolitan area.

Early career

Caringi played college soccer at the University of Maryland, Baltimore County from 2010 to 2013. During his time at college, Caringi appeared for USL PDL club Baltimore Bohemians in 2012 and 2013.

Professional

Caringi was selected by Montreal Impact in the third round of the 2014 MLS SuperDraft (48th overall), but was not signed by the club. Caringi later signed with USL Pro club Oklahoma City Energy on March 26, 2014.

Caringi scored a hat trick during the first round of the 2017 Lamar Hunt U.S. Open Cup, leading Christos FC over the NPSL's Fredericksburg FC.

References

External links 
 

1992 births
Living people
American soccer players
UMBC Retrievers men's soccer players
Baltimore Bohemians players
OKC Energy FC players
Christos FC players
Association football forwards
Soccer players from Maryland
CF Montréal draft picks
USL League Two players
Maryland Major Soccer League players
Sportspeople from Baltimore County, Maryland
All-American men's college soccer players